In inorganic chemistry, mineral hydration is a reaction which adds water to the crystal structure of a mineral, usually creating a new mineral, commonly called a hydrate.

In geological terms, the process of mineral hydration is known as retrograde alteration and is a process occurring in retrograde metamorphism. It commonly accompanies metasomatism and is often a feature of wall rock alteration around ore bodies. Hydration of minerals occurs generally in concert with hydrothermal circulation which may be driven by tectonic or igneous activity.

Processes 

There are two main ways in which minerals hydrate. One is conversion of an oxide to a double hydroxide, as with the hydration of calcium oxide—CaO—to calcium hydroxide—Ca(OH)2, the other is with the incorporation of water molecules directly into the crystalline structure of a new mineral. 
The later process is exhibited in the hydration of feldspars to clay minerals, garnet to chlorite, or kyanite to muscovite.

Mineral hydration is also a process in the regolith that results in conversion of silicate minerals into clay minerals.

Some mineral structures, for example, montmorillonite, are capable of including a variable amount of water without significant change to the mineral structure.

Hydration is the mechanism by which hydraulic binders such as Portland cement develop strength. A hydraulic binder is a material that can set and harden submerged in water by forming insoluble products in a hydration reaction. The term hydraulicity or hydraulic activity is indicative of the chemical affinity of the hydration reaction.

Examples of hydrated minerals 

Examples of hydrated minerals include:
 silicates
 phyllosilicates, clay minerals "commonly found on Earth as weathering products of rocks or in hydrothermal systems"
chlorite
 muscovite
 non-silicates
 oxides (etc.) and oxy-hydroxides
 brucite,  
 goethite, FeO(OH)
 carbonates (etc.)
 hydromagnesite, 
 ikaite, the unstable hexahydrate form of calcium carbonate
  hydroxylated minerals 
 saponite
 talc
 hydroxysulfides (mixed sulfides-hydroxides)
 tochilinite, a hydroxysulfide or hydrated sulfide mineral of iron(II) and magnesium of chemical formula: , also written , in IMA notation
 valleriite, an uncommon sulfide-hydroxide mineral of iron(II) and copper of chemical formula: , or

See also
 Clay-water interaction
 Hydration reaction
 Iron(III) oxide-hydroxide
 Ferrihydrite

References 

Metamorphic petrology
Hydrates
Inorganic reactions

ar:إماهة المعادن
es:Hidratación mineral